Fogbo is a small coastal fishing town in the Western Area Rural District of Sierra Leone. Fogbo is in close proximity to the town of Tombo. The major industry in Fogbo is fishing and small scale farming. Tombo has an estimated population of 2,000 residents.

The population of Fogbo is ethnically diverse, and its inhabitants are predominantly muslims.

References

External links
http://allafrica.com/stories/201106291237.html

Villages in Sierra Leone
Western Area